Rugby in France may refer to:

 Rugby union in France
 Rugby league in France